Streptolirion is a genus of climbing monocotyledonous flowering plants in the dayflower family. It consists of a single species, namely Streptolirion volubile. It has a broad distribution in Asia, from China's western Hubei Province  as well as the Russian Far East, Korea and Japan in the northeast, south to Vietnam and west to India. Currently two subspecies are accepted: S. volubile subsp. volubile and S. volubile subsp. khasianum, with the latter being a stronger climber covered with erect brown hairs. Streptolirion can be distinguished from the closely related climber Spatholirion by the former's two-seeded carpels and inflorescences that are all subtended by large involucral bracts. They bear yellow hairs below the anthers, which are believed to increase floral attraction by contrasting with the petals or suggesting additional pollen is present. Despite the large range, an analysis of chromosomes found major differences between Japanese and Indian populations, suggesting that additional species may be yet unrecognized.

References

Commelinaceae
Monotypic Commelinales genera
Flora of the Russian Far East
Flora of Eastern Asia
Flora of China
Flora of the Indian subcontinent
Flora of Indo-China